is an interchange passenger railway station in located in the city of Fujisawa, Kanagawa, Japan, operated by East Japan Railway Company (JR East) and the private railway operators Odakyu Electric Railway and Enoshima Electric Railway. Clustered around the station are large department stores and office buildings, forming the center of the city.

Lines 

Station layout

JR East
JR East uses two island platforms connected by a footbridge to the main station building. Platforms 1 and 2 are used by  Shōnan Liner services. The station has a Midori no Madoguchi staffed ticket office.

Odakyu
The Odakyu line uses a double bay platform. Trains arrive and depart from the west end of the platform and go through crossover points to the northbound and southbound tracks.

Enoshima Electric Railway
The Enoden station uses a single bay platform. Its automated turnstiles are compatible with Suica and Pasmo systems.

History

What is now the JR East station opened on 11 July 1887. The adjacent Enoshima Electric Railway station opened on 1 September 1902, and the Odakyu station opened on 1 April 1929. With the dissolution and privatization of JNR on 1 April 1987, the station came under the operational control of JR East.

Station numbering was introduced to the Odakyu-owned stations January 2014 with Fujisawa being assigned station numbers OH13 for the Enoshima line and EN01 for the Enoshima Electric Railway.

Passenger statistics
In fiscal 2019, the JR East portion of the station was used by an average of 108,873 passengers daily (boarding passengers only). During the same period, the Odakyu portion of the station was used by an average of 165,663 passengers daily, and the Enoden portion of the station was used by 22,968 passengers daily.  

The passenger figures for previous years are as shown below.

Bus terminal

Highway buses 
 Airport Limousine; For Narita International Airport
 Airport Limousine; For Haneda Airport
 For Fuji-Q Highland and Kawaguchiko Station
 Lake & Port; For Sannai, Sennan, Rokugō, Ōmagari Station, Nakasen, Kakunodate Station, and Tazawako Station
 For Fukui Station, Komatsu, and Kanazawa Station
 Southern Cross; For Kyōto Station, Kyōtanabe, Ōsaka Station, Osaka City Air Terminal, Namba Station, Sakai Station, Sakaihigashi Station, and Sakaishi Station

See also
List of railway stations in Japan

References

Yoshikawa, Fumio. Tokaido-sen 130-nen no ayumi. Grand-Prix Publishing (2002)

External links

JR East station information 
Odakyu station information 

Railway stations in Fujisawa, Kanagawa
Railway stations in Japan opened in 1887